Sir John James Baddeley, 1st Baronet,  (22 December 1842 – 28 June 1926) was a Lord Mayor of London.

Background
He was the eldest son of John Baddeley and his wife Frances Beresford, fifth daughter of James Beresford. Baddeley was educated at Cambridge House School in Hackney.

Career
Baddeley was alderman of Farringdon Within and a member of the Court of Common Council from 1886. He was nominated Sheriff of the City of London in 1908 and was made a Knight Bachelor in the following year. 

In 1921, Baddeley was appointed the 593rd Lord Mayor of London. After the end of his tenure in the following year, he was created a baronet, of Lakefield, in the Parish of St Mary, Stoke Newington, in the County of London on 24 November. Baddeley was a Commander of the Swedish Royal Order of Vasa and of the Russian Order of St Anna. 

He served as justice of the peace for the County of London.

Family

On 13 August 1868, he married firstly Mary Elizabeth Locks, daughter of William Locks, and had by her nine children, four daughters and five sons. After her death in 1906, Baddeley remarried Florence Bertha Mathews, daughter of Joseph Douglas Mathews on 25 July 1912.

He died in 1926 and was buried in a family grave on the eastern side of Highgate Cemetery. He was succeeded in the baronetcy by his oldest son John.

Works
A History of St Giles's Church (1880)
The Aldermen of the City of London from 1276 (1900)
A History of the Guildhall (1912)
Cripplegate: One of the Twenty-Six Wards of the City of London (1921)

References

1842 births
1926 deaths
Burials at Highgate Cemetery
Baronets in the Baronetage of the United Kingdom
English justices of the peace
Knights Bachelor
Commanders of the Order of Vasa
Recipients of the Order of St. Anna
Sheriffs of the City of London
20th-century lord mayors of London
20th-century English politicians
19th-century English politicians